Rabbits, also known as bunnies or bunny rabbits, are small mammals in the family Leporidae (which also contains the hares) of the order Lagomorpha (which also contains the pikas). Oryctolagus cuniculus includes the European rabbit species and its descendants, the world's 305 breeds of domestic rabbit. Sylvilagus includes 13 wild rabbit species, among them the seven types of cottontail. The European rabbit, which has been introduced on every continent except Antarctica, is familiar throughout the world as a wild prey animal and as a domesticated form of livestock and pet. With its widespread effect on ecologies and cultures, the rabbit is, in many areas of the world, a part of daily life—as food, clothing, a companion, and a source of artistic inspiration.

Although once considered rodents, lagomorphs like rabbits have been discovered to have diverged separately and earlier than their rodent cousins and have a number of traits rodents lack, like two extra incisors.

Terminology and etymology
A male rabbit is called a buck; a female is called a doe.  An older term for an adult rabbit used until the 18th century is coney (derived ultimately from the Latin ), while rabbit once referred only to the young animals. Another term for a young rabbit is bunny, though this term is often applied informally (particularly by children) to rabbits generally, especially domestic ones. More recently, the term kit or kitten has been used to refer to a young rabbit.

A group of rabbits is known as a colony or nest (or, occasionally, a warren, though this more commonly refers to where the rabbits live). A group of baby rabbits produced from a single mating is referred to as a litter and a group of domestic rabbits living together is sometimes called a herd.

The word rabbit itself derives from the Middle English , a borrowing from the Walloon , which was a diminutive of the French or Middle Dutch .

Taxonomy

Rabbits and hares were formerly classified in the order Rodentia (rodent) until 1912, when they were moved into a new order, Lagomorpha (which also includes pikas). Below are some of the genera and species of the rabbit.

 Order Lagomorpha
 Family Leporidae (in part)
 Genus Brachylagus
 Pygmy rabbit, Brachylagus idahoensis
 Genus Bunolagus
 Bushman rabbit, Bunolagus monticularis
 Genus Lepus
 Genus Nesolagus
 Sumatran striped rabbit, Nesolagus netscheri
 Annamite striped rabbit, Nesolagus timminsi
 Genus Oryctolagus
 European rabbit, Oryctolagus cuniculus
 Genus Pentalagus
 Amami rabbit/Ryūkyū rabbit, Pentalagus furnessi
 Genus Poelagus
 Central African Rabbit, Poelagus marjorita
 Genus Romerolagus
 Volcano rabbit, Romerolagus diazi
 Genus Sylvilagus
 Swamp rabbit, Sylvilagus aquaticus
 Desert cottontail, Sylvilagus audubonii
 Brush rabbit, Sylvilagus bachmani
 Forest rabbit, Sylvilagus brasiliensis
 Mexican cottontail, Sylvilagus cunicularis
 Dice's cottontail, Sylvilagus dicei
 Eastern cottontail, Sylvilagus floridanus
 Tres Marias rabbit, Sylvilagus graysoni
 Omilteme cottontail, Sylvilagus insonus
 San Jose brush rabbit, Sylvilagus mansuetus
 Mountain cottontail, Sylvilagus nuttallii
 Marsh rabbit, Sylvilagus palustris
 New England cottontail, Sylvilagus transitionalis

Differences from hares

The term rabbit is typically used for all Leporidae species excluding the genus Lepus. Members of that genus are instead known as hares or jackrabbits.

Lepus species are typically precocial, born relatively mature and mobile with hair and good vision, while rabbit species are altricial, born hairless and blind, and requiring closer care. Hares live a relatively solitary life in a simple nest above the ground, while most rabbits live in social groups in burrows or warrens. Hares are generally larger than rabbits, with ears that are more elongated, and with hind legs that are larger and longer. Descendants of the European rabbit are commonly bred as livestock and kept as pets, whereas no hares have been domesticated – the breed called the Belgian hare is actually a domestic rabbit which has been selectively bred to resemble a hare.

Domestication

Rabbits have long been domesticated. Beginning in the Middle Ages, the European rabbit has been widely kept as livestock, starting in ancient Rome. Selective breeding has generated a wide variety of rabbit breeds, of which many (since the early 19th century) are also kept as pets. Some strains of rabbit have been bred specifically as research subjects.

As livestock, rabbits are bred for their meat and fur. The earliest breeds were important sources of meat, and so became larger than wild rabbits, but domestic rabbits in modern times range in size from dwarf to giant. Rabbit fur, prized for its softness, can be found in a broad range of coat colors and patterns, as well as lengths. The Angora rabbit breed, for example, was developed for its long, silky fur, which is often hand-spun into yarn. Other domestic rabbit breeds have been developed primarily for the commercial fur trade, including the Rex, which has a short plush coat.

Biology

Evolution
Because the rabbit's epiglottis is engaged over the soft palate except when swallowing, the rabbit is an obligate nasal breather. Rabbits have two sets of incisor teeth, one behind the other. This way they can be distinguished from rodents, with which they are often confused. Carl Linnaeus originally grouped rabbits and rodents under the class Glires; later, they were separated as the scientific consensus is that many of their similarities were a result of convergent evolution. Recent DNA analysis and the discovery of a common ancestor has supported the view that they share a common lineage, so rabbits and rodents are now often grouped together in the superorder Glires.

Morphology

Since speed and agility are a rabbit's main defenses against predators (including the swift fox), rabbits have large hind leg bones and well-developed musculature. Though plantigrade at rest, rabbits are on their toes while running, assuming a more digitigrade posture. Rabbits use their strong claws for digging and (along with their teeth) for defense. Each front foot has four toes plus a dewclaw. Each hind foot has four toes (but no dewclaw).

Most wild rabbits (especially compared to hares) have relatively full, egg-shaped bodies. The soft coat of the wild rabbit is agouti in coloration (or, rarely, melanistic), which aids in camouflage. The tail of the rabbit (with the exception of the cottontail species) is dark on top and white below. Cottontails have white on the top of their tails.

As a result of the position of the eyes in its skull, the rabbit has a field of vision that encompasses nearly 360 degrees, with just a small blind spot at the bridge of the nose.

Hind limb elements

The anatomy of rabbits' hind limbs are structurally similar to that of other land mammals and contribute to their specialized form of locomotion. The bones of the hind limbs consist of long bones (the femur, tibia, fibula, and phalanges) as well as short bones (the tarsals). These bones are created through endochondral ossification during development. Like most land mammals, the round head of the femur articulates with the acetabulum of the os coxae. The femur articulates with the tibia, but not the fibula, which is fused to the tibia. The tibia and fibula articulate with the tarsals of the pes, commonly called the foot. The hind limbs of the rabbit are longer than the front limbs. This allows them to produce their hopping form of locomotion. Longer hind limbs are more capable of producing faster speeds. Hares, which have longer legs than cottontail rabbits, are able to move considerably faster. Rabbits stay just on their toes when moving; this is called Digitigrade locomotion. The hind feet have four long toes that allow for this and are webbed to prevent them from spreading when hopping. Rabbits do not have paw pads on their feet like most other animals that use digitigrade locomotion. Instead, they have coarse compressed hair that offers protection.

Musculature

Rabbits have muscled hind legs that allow for maximum force, maneuverability, and acceleration that is divided into three main parts; foot, thigh, and leg. The hind limbs of a rabbit are an exaggerated feature. They are much longer than the forelimbs, providing more force. Rabbits run on their toes to gain the optimal stride during locomotion. The force put out by the hind limbs is contributed to both the structural anatomy of the fusion tibia and fibula, and muscular features. Bone formation and removal, from a cellular standpoint, is directly correlated to hind limb muscles. Action pressure from muscles creates force that is then distributed through the skeletal structures. Rabbits that generate less force, putting less stress on bones are more prone to osteoporosis due to bone rarefaction. In rabbits, the more fibers in a muscle, the more resistant to fatigue. For example, hares have a greater resistance to fatigue than cottontails. The muscles of rabbit's hind limbs can be classified into four main categories: hamstrings, quadriceps, dorsiflexors, or plantar flexors. The quadriceps muscles are in charge of force production when jumping. Complementing these muscles are the hamstrings, which aid in short bursts of action. These muscles play off of one another in the same way as the plantar flexors and dorsiflexors, contributing to the generation and actions associated with force.

Ears

Within the order lagomorphs, the ears are utilized to detect and avoid predators. In the family Leporidae, the ears are typically longer than they are wide. For example, in black tailed jack rabbits, their long ears cover a greater surface area relative to their body size that allow them to detect predators from far away. Contrasted to cotton tailed rabbits, their ears are smaller and shorter, requiring predators to be closer to detect them before they can flee. Evolution has favored rabbits having shorter ears, so the larger surface area does not cause them to lose heat in more temperate regions. The opposite can be seen in rabbits that live in hotter climates, mainly because they possess longer ears that have a larger surface area that help with dispersion of heat as well as the theory that sound does not travel well in more arid air, opposed to cooler air. Therefore, longer ears are meant to aid the organism in detecting predators sooner rather than later in warmer temperatures. The rabbit is characterized by its shorter ears while hares are characterized by their longer ears. Rabbits' ears are an important structure to aid thermoregulation and detect predators due to how the outer, middle, and inner ear muscles coordinate with one another. The ear muscles also aid in maintaining balance and movement when fleeing predators.

Outer ear
The auricle, also known as the pinna, is a rabbit's outer ear. The rabbit's pinnae represent a fair part of the body surface area. It is theorized that the ears aid in dispersion of heat at temperatures above 30 °C with rabbits in warmer climates having longer pinnae due to this. Another theory is that the ears function as shock absorbers that could aid and stabilize rabbit's vision when fleeing predators, but this has typically only been seen in hares. The rest of the outer ear has bent canals that lead to the eardrum or tympanic membrane.

Middle ear
The middle ear is filled with three bones called ossicles and is separated by the outer eardrum in the back of the rabbit's skull. The three ossicles are called hammer, anvil, and stirrup and act to decrease sound before it hits the inner ear. In general, the ossicles act as a barrier to the inner ear for sound energy.

Inner ear
Inner ear fluid called endolymph receives the sound energy. After receiving the energy, later within the inner ear there are two parts: the cochlea that utilizes sound waves from the ossicles and the vestibular apparatus that manages the rabbit's position in regards to movement. Within the cochlea there is a basilar membrane that contains sensory hair structures utilized to send nerve signals to the brain so it can recognize different sound frequencies. Within the vestibular apparatus the rabbit possesses three semicircular canals to help detect angular motion.

Thermoregulation

Thermoregulation is the process that an organism utilizes to maintain an optimal body temperature independent of external conditions. This process is carried out by the pinnae, which takes up most of the rabbit's body surface and contain a vascular network and arteriovenous shunts. In a rabbit, the optimal body temperature is around 38.5–40℃. If their body temperature exceeds or does not meet this optimal temperature, the rabbit must return to homeostasis. Homeostasis of body temperature is maintained by the use of their large, highly vascularized ears that are able to change the amount of blood flow that passes through the ears.

Constriction and dilation of blood vessels in the ears are used to control the core body temperature of a rabbit. If the core temperature exceeds its optimal temperature greatly, blood flow is constricted to limit the amount of blood going through the vessels. With this constriction, there is only a limited amount of blood that is passing through the ears where ambient heat would be able to heat the blood that is flowing through the ears and therefore, increasing the body temperature. Constriction is also used when the ambient temperature is much lower than that of the rabbit's core body temperature. When the ears are constricted it again limits blood flow through the ears to conserve the optimal body temperature of the rabbit. If the ambient temperature is either 15 degrees above or below the optimal body temperature, the blood vessels will dilate. With the blood vessels being enlarged, the blood is able to pass through the large surface area, causing it to either heat or cool down.

During hot summers, the rabbit has the capability to stretch its pinnae, which allows for greater surface area and increase heat dissipation. In cold winters, the rabbit does the opposite and folds its ears in order to decrease its surface area to the ambient air, which would decrease their body temperature.

The jackrabbit has the largest ears within the Oryctolagus cuniculus group. Their ears contribute to 17% of their total body surface area.  Their large pinna were evolved to maintain homeostasis while in the extreme temperatures of the desert.

Respiratory system

The rabbit's nasal cavity lies dorsal to the oral cavity, and the two compartments are separated by the hard and soft palate. The nasal cavity itself is separated into a left and right side by a cartilage barrier, and it is covered in fine hairs that trap dust before it can enter the respiratory tract. As the rabbit breathes, air flows in through the nostrils along the alar folds. From there, the air moves into the nasal cavity, also known as the nasopharynx, down through the trachea, through the larynx, and into the lungs. The larynx functions as the rabbit's voice box, which enables it to produce a wide variety of sounds. The trachea is a long tube embedded with cartilaginous rings that prevent the tube from collapsing as air moves in and out of the lungs. The trachea then splits into a left and right bronchus, which meet the lungs at a structure called the hilum. From there, the bronchi split into progressively more narrow and numerous branches. The bronchi branch into bronchioles, into respiratory bronchioles, and ultimately terminate at the alveolar ducts. The branching that is typically found in rabbit lungs is a clear example of monopodial branching, in which smaller branches divide out laterally from a larger central branch.

The structure of the rabbit's nasal and oral cavities necessitates breathing through the nose. This is due to the fact that the epiglottis is fixed to the backmost portion of the soft palate. Within the oral cavity, a layer of tissue sits over the opening of the glottis, which blocks airflow from the oral cavity to the trachea.  The epiglottis functions to prevent the rabbit from aspirating on its food. Further, the presence of a soft and hard palate allow the rabbit to breathe through its nose while it feeds.

Rabbits' lungs are divided into four lobes: the cranial, middle, caudal, and accessory lobes. The right lung is made up of all four lobes, while the left lung only has two: the cranial and caudal lobes. In order to provide space for the heart, the left cranial lobe of the lungs is significantly smaller than that of the right. The diaphragm is a muscular structure that lies caudal to the lungs and contracts to facilitate respiration.

Digestion

Rabbits are herbivores that feed by grazing on grass and other leafy plants. Consequently, their diet contains large amounts of cellulose, which is hard to digest. Rabbits solve this problem via a form of hindgut fermentation. They pass two distinct types of feces: hard droppings and soft black viscous pellets, the latter of which are known as caecotrophs or "night droppings"  and are immediately eaten (a behaviour known as coprophagy). Rabbits reingest their own droppings (rather than chewing the cud as do cows and numerous other herbivores) to digest their food further and extract sufficient nutrients.

Rabbits graze heavily and rapidly for roughly the first half-hour of a grazing period (usually in the late afternoon), followed by about half an hour of more selective feeding. In this time, the rabbit will also excrete many hard fecal pellets, being waste pellets that will not be reingested. If the environment is relatively non-threatening, the rabbit will remain outdoors for many hours, grazing at intervals. While out of the burrow, the rabbit will occasionally reingest its soft, partially digested pellets; this is rarely observed, since the pellets are reingested as they are produced.

Hard pellets are made up of hay-like fragments of plant cuticle and stalk, being the final waste product after redigestion of soft pellets. These are only released outside the burrow and are not reingested. Soft pellets are usually produced several hours after grazing, after the hard pellets have all been excreted. They are made up of micro-organisms and undigested plant cell walls.

Rabbits are hindgut digesters. This means that most of their digestion takes place in their large intestine and cecum. In rabbits, the cecum is about 10 times bigger than the stomach and it along with the large intestine makes up roughly 40% of the rabbit's digestive tract. The unique musculature of the cecum allows the intestinal tract of the rabbit to separate fibrous material from more digestible material; the fibrous material is passed as feces, while the more nutritious material is encased in a mucous lining as a cecotrope. Cecotropes, sometimes called "night feces", are high in minerals, vitamins and proteins that are necessary to the rabbit's health. Rabbits eat these to meet their nutritional requirements; the mucous coating allows the nutrients to pass through the acidic stomach for digestion in the intestines. This process allows rabbits to extract the necessary nutrients from their food.

The chewed plant material collects in the large cecum, a secondary chamber between the large and small intestine containing large quantities of symbiotic bacteria that help with the digestion of cellulose and also produce certain B vitamins. The pellets are about 56% bacteria by dry weight, largely accounting for the pellets being 24.4% protein on average. The soft feces form here and contain up to five times the vitamins of hard feces. After being excreted, they are eaten whole by the rabbit and redigested in a special part of the stomach. The pellets remain intact for up to six hours in the stomach; the bacteria within continue to digest the plant carbohydrates. This double-digestion process enables rabbits to use nutrients that they may have missed during the first passage through the gut, as well as the nutrients formed by the microbial activity and thus ensures that maximum nutrition is derived from the food they eat. This process serves the same purpose in the rabbit as rumination does in cattle and sheep. 

Because rabbits cannot vomit, if buildup occurs within the intestines (due often to a diet with insufficient fibre), intestinal blockage can occur.

Reproduction

The adult male reproductive system forms the same as most mammals with the seminiferous tubular compartment containing the Sertoli cells and an adluminal compartment that contains the Leydig cells. The Leydig cells produce testosterone, which maintains libido and creates secondary sex characteristics such as the genital tubercle and penis. The Sertoli cells triggers the production of Anti-Müllerian duct hormone, which absorbs the Müllerian duct. In an adult male rabbit, the sheath of the penis is cylinder-like and can be extruded as early as two months of age. The scrotal sacs lay lateral to the penis and contain epididymal fat pads which protect the testes. Between 10 and 14 weeks, the testes descend and are able to retract into the pelvic cavity in order to thermoregulate. Furthermore, the secondary sex characteristics, such as the testes, are complex and secrete many compounds. These compounds include fructose, citric acid, minerals, and a uniquely high amount of catalase.

The adult female reproductive tract is bipartite, which prevents an embryo from translocating between uteri. The two uterine horns communicate to two cervixes and forms one vaginal canal. Along with being bipartite, the female rabbit does not go through an estrus cycle, which causes mating induced ovulation.

The average female rabbit becomes sexually mature at three to eight months of age and can conceive at any time of the year for the duration of her life. Egg and sperm production can begin to decline after three years. During mating, the male rabbit will mount the female rabbit from behind and insert his penis into the female and make rapid pelvic hip thrusts. The encounter lasts only 20–40 seconds and after, the male will throw himself backwards off the female.

The rabbit gestation period is short and ranges from 28 to 36 days with an average period of 31 days. A longer gestation period will generally yield a smaller litter while shorter gestation periods will give birth to a larger litter. The size of a single litter can range from four to 12 kits allowing a female to deliver up to 60 new kits a year. After birth, the female can become pregnant again as early as the next day.

After mating, hormonal changes will cause the doe to begin to dig a burrow for her nest about a week before giving birth. Between three days and a few hours before giving birth another series of hormonal changes will cause her to prepare the nest structure. The doe will first gather grass for a structure, and an elevation in prolactin shortly before birth will cause her fur to shed that the doe will then use to line the nest, providing insulation for the newborn kits.

The mortality rates of embryos are high in rabbits and can be due to infection, trauma, poor nutrition and environmental stress so a high fertility rate is necessary to counter this.

Sleep

Rabbits may appear to be crepuscular, but their natural inclination is toward nocturnal activity. In 2011, the average sleep time of a rabbit in captivity was calculated at 8.4 hours per day. As with other prey animals, rabbits often sleep with their eyes open, so that sudden movements will awaken the rabbit to respond to potential danger.

Diseases and immunity

In addition to being at risk of disease from common pathogens such as Bordetella bronchiseptica and Escherichia coli, rabbits can contract the virulent, species-specific viruses RHD ("rabbit hemorrhagic disease", a form of calicivirus) or myxomatosis. Among the parasites that infect rabbits are tapeworms (such as Taenia serialis), external parasites (including fleas and mites), coccidia species, and Toxoplasma gondii. Domesticated rabbits with a diet lacking in high fiber sources, such as hay and grass, are susceptible to potentially lethal gastrointestinal stasis. Rabbits and hares are almost never found to be infected with rabies and have not been known to transmit rabies to humans.

Encephalitozoon cuniculi, an obligate intracellular parasite is also capable of infecting many mammals including rabbits.

Rabbit immunity has significantly diverged from other tetrapods in the manner it employs immunoglobulin light chains. In one case McCartney-Francis et al., 1984 discover a unique additional disulfide bond between Cys 80 in Vκ and Cys 171 in Cκ. They suggest that this may serve to stabilise rabbit antibodies. Meanwhile  shows high amino acid divergence between domesticated types and ferals derived from them. This can be as high as 40%.

Rabbit hemorrhagic disease is caused by strains of rabbit hemorrhagic disease virus (RHDV) including type 2 (RHDV2). RHDV2 was detected for the first time in Washington state, USA in May 2022 and then in August once in Washington and twice in Oregon.

Ecology

Rabbits are prey animals and are therefore constantly aware of their surroundings. For instance, in Mediterranean Europe, rabbits are the main prey of red foxes, badgers, and Iberian lynxes. If confronted by a potential threat, a rabbit may freeze and observe then warn others in the warren with powerful thumps on the ground. Rabbits have a remarkably wide field of vision, and a good deal of it is devoted to overhead scanning.  The doe (mother) is aware that she gives off scent which can attract predators, so she will stay away from the nest to avoid putting the kits (babies) in danger, returning the nest only a few times a day to feed the kits.

Rabbits survive predation by burrowing, hopping away in a zig-zag motion, and, if captured, delivering powerful kicks with their hind legs. Their strong teeth allow them to eat and to bite in order to escape a struggle. The longest-lived rabbit on record, a domesticated European rabbit living in Tasmania, died at age 18. The lifespan of wild rabbits is much shorter; the average longevity of an eastern cottontail, for instance, is less than one year.

Rabbits are known to be able to catch fire and spread wildfires, but the efficiency and relevance of this method has been doubted by forest experts who contend that a rabbit on fire could move some meters. Knowledge on fire-spreading rabbits is based on anecdotes as there is no known scientific investigation on the subject.

Habitat and range

Rabbit habitats include meadows, woods, forests, grasslands, deserts and wetlands. Rabbits live in groups, and the best known species, the European rabbit, lives in burrows, or rabbit holes. A group of burrows is called a warren.

More than half the world's rabbit population resides in North America. They are also native to southwestern Europe, Southeast Asia, Sumatra, some islands of Japan, and in parts of Africa and South America. They are not naturally found in most of Eurasia, where a number of species of hares are present. Rabbits first entered South America relatively recently, as part of the Great American Interchange. Much of the continent has just one species of rabbit, the tapeti, while most of South America's southern cone is without rabbits.

The European rabbit has been introduced to many places around the world. A recent study found that "the (so-called) Chinese rabbits were introduced from Europe. Genetic diversity in Chinese rabbits was very low."

Rabbits have been launched into space orbit.

Environmental problems

Rabbits have been a source of environmental problems when introduced into the wild by humans. As a result of their appetites, and the rate at which they breed, feral rabbit depredation can be problematic for agriculture. Gassing (fumigation of warrens), barriers (fences), shooting, snaring, and ferreting have been used to control rabbit populations, but the most effective measures are diseases such as myxomatosis (myxo or mixi, colloquially) and calicivirus. In Europe, where rabbits are farmed on a large scale, they are protected against myxomatosis and calicivirus with a genetically modified virus. The virus was developed in Spain, and is beneficial to rabbit farmers. If it were to make its way into wild populations in areas such as Australia, it could create a population boom, as those diseases are the most serious threats to rabbit survival. Rabbits in Australia and New Zealand are considered to be such a pest that land owners are legally obliged to control them.

As food and clothing

In some areas, wild rabbits and hares are hunted for their meat, a lean source of high quality protein. In the wild, such hunting is accomplished with the aid of trained falcons, ferrets, or dogs, as well as with snares or other traps, and rifles. A caught rabbit may be dispatched with a sharp blow to the back of its head, a practice from which the term rabbit punch is derived.

Wild leporids comprise a small portion of global rabbit-meat consumption. Domesticated descendants of the European rabbit (Oryctolagus cuniculus) that are bred and kept as livestock (a practice called cuniculture) account for the estimated 200 million tons of rabbit meat produced annually. Approximately 1.2 billion rabbits are slaughtered each year for meat worldwide. The largest producers of rabbit meat in 1994 were China, Russia, Italy, France, and Spain. Rabbit meat was once a common commodity in Sydney, Australia, but declined after the myxomatosis virus was intentionally introduced to control the exploding population of feral rabbits in the area.

In the United Kingdom, fresh rabbit is sold in butcher shops and markets, and some supermarkets sell frozen rabbit meat. At farmers markets there, including the famous Borough Market in London, rabbit carcasses are sometimes displayed hanging, unbutchered (in the traditional style), next to braces of pheasant or other small game. Rabbit meat is a feature of Moroccan cuisine, where it is cooked in a tajine with "raisins and grilled almonds added a few minutes before serving". In China, rabbit meat is particularly popular in Sichuan cuisine, with its stewed rabbit, spicy diced rabbit, BBQ-style rabbit, and even spicy rabbit heads, which have been compared to spicy duck neck. Rabbit meat is comparatively unpopular elsewhere in the Asia-Pacific.

An extremely rare infection associated with rabbits-as-food is tularemia (also known as rabbit fever), which may be contracted from an infected rabbit. Hunters are at higher risk for tularemia because of the potential for inhaling the bacteria during the skinning process.

In addition to their meat, rabbits are used for their wool, fur, and pelts, as well as their nitrogen-rich manure and their high-protein milk. Production industries have developed domesticated rabbit breeds (such as the well-known Angora rabbit) to efficiently fill these needs.

In art, literature, and culture

Rabbits are often used as a symbol of fertility or rebirth, and have long been associated with spring and Easter as the Easter Bunny. The species' role as a prey animal with few defenses evokes vulnerability and innocence, and in folklore and modern children's stories, rabbits often appear as sympathetic characters, able to connect easily with youth of all kinds (for example, the Velveteen Rabbit, or Thumper in Bambi).

With its reputation as a prolific breeder, the rabbit juxtaposes sexuality with innocence, as in the Playboy Bunny. The rabbit (as a swift prey animal) is also known for its speed, agility, and endurance, symbolized (for example) by the marketing icons the Energizer Bunny and the Duracell Bunny.

Folklore

The rabbit often appears in folklore as the trickster archetype, as he uses his cunning to outwit his enemies.

 In Aztec mythology, a pantheon of four hundred rabbit gods known as Centzon Totochtin, led by Ometochtli or Two Rabbit, represented fertility, parties, and drunkenness.
 In Central Africa, the common hare (Kalulu), is "inevitably described" as a trickster figure.
 In Chinese folklore, rabbits accompany Chang'e on the Moon. In the Chinese New Year, the zodiacal rabbit is one of the twelve celestial animals in the Chinese zodiac. Note that the Vietnamese zodiac includes a zodiacal cat in place of the rabbit, possibly because rabbits did not inhabit Vietnam. The most common explanation is that the ancient Vietnamese word for "rabbit" (mao) sounds like the Chinese word for "cat" (卯, mao).
 In Japanese tradition, rabbits live on the Moon where they make mochi, the popular snack of mashed sticky rice. This comes from interpreting the pattern of dark patches on the moon as a rabbit standing on tiptoes on the left pounding on an usu, a Japanese mortar.
 In Jewish folklore, rabbits (shfanim שפנים) are associated with cowardice, a usage still current in contemporary Israeli spoken Hebrew (similar to the English colloquial use of "chicken" to denote cowardice).
 In Korean mythology, as in Japanese, rabbits live on the moon making rice cakes ("Tteok" in Korean).
 In Anishinaabe traditional beliefs, held by the Ojibwe and some other Native American peoples, Nanabozho, or Great Rabbit, is an important deity related to the creation of the world.
 A Vietnamese mythological story portrays the rabbit of innocence and youthfulness. The gods of the myth are shown to be hunting and killing rabbits to show off their power.
 Buddhism, Christianity, and Judaism have associations with an ancient circular motif called the three rabbits (or "three hares"). Its meaning ranges from "peace and tranquility", to purity or the Holy Trinity, to Kabbalistic levels of the soul or to the Jewish diaspora.  The tripartite symbol also appears in heraldry and even tattoos.

The rabbit as trickster is a part of American popular culture, as Br'er Rabbit (from African-American folktales and, later, Disney animation) and Bugs Bunny (the cartoon character from Warner Bros.), for example.

Anthropomorphized rabbits have appeared in film and literature, in Alice's Adventures in Wonderland (the White Rabbit and the March Hare characters), in Watership Down (including the film and television adaptations), in Rabbit Hill (by Robert Lawson), and in the Peter Rabbit stories (by Beatrix Potter).  In the 1920s Oswald the Lucky Rabbit was a popular cartoon character.

A rabbit's foot may be carried as an amulet, believed to bring protection and good luck. This belief is found in many parts of the world, with the earliest use being recorded in Europe c. 600 BC.

On the Isle of Portland in Dorset, UK, the rabbit is said to be unlucky and even speaking the creature's name can cause upset among older island residents. This is thought to date back to early times in the local quarrying industry where (to save space) extracted stones that were not fit for sale were set aside in what became tall, unstable walls. The local rabbits' tendency to burrow there would weaken the walls and their collapse resulted in injuries or even death. Thus, invoking the name of the culprit became an unlucky act to be avoided. In the local culture to this day, the rabbit (when he has to be referred to) may instead be called a “long ears” or “underground mutton”, so as not to risk bringing a downfall upon oneself. While it was true 50 years ago that a pub on the island could be emptied by calling out the word "rabbit", this has become more fable than fact in modern times.

In other parts of Britain and in North America, invoking the rabbit's name may instead bring good luck. "Rabbit rabbit rabbit" is one variant of an apotropaic or talismanic superstition that involves saying or repeating the word "rabbit" (or "rabbits" or "white rabbits" or some combination thereof) out loud upon waking on the first day of each month, because doing so will ensure good fortune for the duration of that month.

The "rabbit test" is a term, first used in 1949, for the Friedman test, an early diagnostic tool for detecting a pregnancy in humans. It is a common misconception (or perhaps an urban legend) that the test-rabbit would die if the woman was pregnant. This led to the phrase "the rabbit died" becoming a euphemism for a positive pregnancy test.

See also

 Animal track
 Cuniculture
 Dwarf rabbit
 Hare games
 Jackalope
 Lethal dwarfism in rabbits
 List of animal names
 List of rabbit breeds
 Lop rabbit
 Rabbits in the arts
 Rabbit show jumping

References

Notes

Citations

Further reading
 Windling, Terri.

External links

 American Rabbit Breeders Association organization, which promotes all phases of rabbit keeping
 House Rabbit Society an activist organization that promotes keeping rabbits indoors

 
Articles containing video clips
Cosmopolitan mammals
Extant Ypresian first appearances
Herbivorous mammals
Mammal common names
Paraphyletic groups